The Belvárosi Bridge in Szeged, Hungary, is the main bridge of the city, connecting Újszeged, on the left bank of the river Tisza, to the other quarters. It was the only crossing on the river in the County until the finishing of the Bertalan Bridge in 1979. Every year in May the Hídivásár (Bridgemarket) is held there, drawing thousands of visitors to the city.

Its two ends are:

 Roosevelt Square in Szeged, with the Móra Ferenc Múzeum
 Torontál Square in Újszeged, with the Erzsébet Park

History 

After the Great Flood of Szeged in 1879, it was an important aspect of the renovations to create a permanent crossing on the Tisza river. The construction began in 1880 December according to the plans of Gustave Eiffel and János Feketeházy, and finished on September 23 of 1883. 

During the World War II it was seriously damaged on September 3, 1944 in an air attack by the Allies, then at October 9 the same year, German soldiers exploded it while withdrawing before Soviet troops. 

The removal of the wreckage started only after the war in 1946, and the reconstruction took two years by the plans of Győző Mihailich and Róbert Folly. The renovated bridge finally reopened in 1948.

Between 1909–1944 and 1949–1979 the Tram line 5 ran through the bridge, since then Trolleybus lines 5 and 7 superseded it.

Gallery

References

Bridges in Hungary
Bridges completed in 1948
Bridges completed in 1883
Bridges over the Tisza
Buildings and structures in Szeged